The Mitsubishi Concept-ZT is a concept car developed by Japanese automaker Mitsubishi Motors, and first exhibited at the 40th Tokyo Motor Show in September 2007.

Following the lead of other recent Mitsubishi prototypes, "green plastic" recyclable resin is used extensively in the body panels and interior for environmental reasons.

Although there was initially no official confirmation, the automotive press was confident that this prototype presaged the next generation of the Mitsubishi Galant, and the Galant-based Mitsubishi 380 in Australia. However, in August 2008 the company announced that it had abandoned production plans using the same drivetrain and a steel body, claiming they could no longer make a business case for the car.

References

ZT